North Binness Island is an island in Langstone Harbour It is  long and up to  wide but only rises to  above Ordnance Datum The island was originally (along with a large part of Farlington Marshes)  part of Binner's Island. The island has been uninhabited in recent times but there is evidence of historical occupation. There is also archaeological evidence that suggests the island was occupied during the Bronze Age and the Roman period. Finds from the Bronze Age include evidence of a salt works. The Island and has also produced finds dating back to the Mesolithic period prior to the formation of Langstone Harbour and the island.

The island was formerly home to a pond which is now filled with mud. Plants on the island consist of salt-water grasses and a few trees.

In 1978 the island along with the other islands in Langstone harbour was acquired by the Royal Society for the Protection of Birds who turned it into a bird sanctuary. Since that time unauthorised landings have been forbidden.

References

Islands of Hampshire
Borough of Havant